The Saint Mungo Cup was a one-off football tournament held in Glasgow, Scotland, to celebrate the 1951 Festival of Britain. The competition was contested by fourteen 'Scottish Division A' clubs together with Clyde and Queens Park from 'Division B'. Celtic defeated Aberdeen 3–2 in the final in front of a crowd of 81,000 at Hampden Park.

Original format 

The original format of the competition was to include the six Glasgow clubs, with the addition of Hibernian, Hearts, Aberdeen and Dundee.

Following protests on the behalf of club's that would excluded from the competition at a Scottish Football Association meeting, the proposed format was abandoned and the tournament format would be reconsidered.

Summary
On their road to the final, Celtic had beaten Heart of Midlothian 2–1, Clyde 4–2 in a replay the day after a 4–4 draw in the quarter-finals, and Raith Rovers 3–1 in the semi-finals. In the final, Aberdeen (who had eliminated Rangers, St Mirren and Hibernian) went two goals ahead with goals from Harry Yorston in 14 minutes (Celtic goalkeeper George Hunter was injured in the process, with Bobby Evans taking over between the posts for the next 12 minutes) and Tommy Bogan on 35 minutes after Hunter returned to the field. Charlie Tully changed the game in Celtic's favour in the second half, setting up two Sean Fallon goals  and the winner, scored by Jimmy Walsh.

The Glasgow Corporation, who had organised the tournament along with the Glasgow Football Association and provided the cup (named after Glasgow's patron saint) as their donation to the Festival of Britain, were left red-faced when the triumphant players and manager Jimmy McGrory examined the trophy and discovered that it was decorated with ornate life belts and mermaids. It was revealed that the trophy was not in fact new but third-hand, having been made in 1894 as a yachting trophy, then been altered for a football competition in 1912 between Provan Gas Works and a City of Glasgow Police team. Celtic at first demanded a new trophy, but today the St Mungo Cup proudly takes its place in the Celtic Park trophy room.

There was also a tournament for clubs in the lower division, the St Mungo Quaich won by Dumbarton with a win over Ayr United in the final, and a series of friendly matches between Scottish and English clubs, five featuring Ayr United who lost each time.

Final

Teams

See also
1888 Glasgow Exhibition Cup, similar tournament in 1888
Glasgow International Exhibition Cup, similar tournament in 1901
Edinburgh Exhibition Cup, similar tournament in 1908
Empire Exhibition Trophy, similar tournament in 1938 (also featuring English clubs)
Coronation Cup (football), similar tournament in 1953 (also featuring English clubs)

References

Defunct football cup competitions in Scotland
1951–52 in Scottish football
Festival of Britain
Football in Glasgow